Melchior Vulpius (c. 1570 in Wasungen – 7 August 1615 in Weimar) was a German singer and composer of church music.

Vulpius came from a poor craftsman's family. He studied at the local school in Wasungen (in Thuringia) with Johannes Steuerlein. From 1588, he attended the school in Speyer. After marrying in 1589, he obtained a position at the Gymnasium in Schleusingen. In 1596, he was named cantor in Weimar.

He wrote and published church music, the best known being the setting of the hymn  (Ah, stay with your grace) on a text by Josua Stegmann. This setting was often performed in Protestant churches on New Year's Day and at the end of the service. The Cantional (a collection of songs) was published posthumously in 1646 in Gotha.

The St. Matthew Passion is another of Vulpius’ well-known works. By the middle of the 17th century the music for the Passion had spread also to Sweden and later to Finland. Based on the several copies of music manuscripts that have been preserved in different archives in Finland, it can be concluded that the Passion became rather popular there. According to historical sources, this was the very first polyphonic passion composition ever performed in Finland. Later, the Passion fell into oblivion, but from 2007 onwards, the Finnish Vulpius Passion tradition has been revived by Sonus Borealis, that has been performing it in several churches in Southeast Finland, and Kuninkaantien muusikot (Musicians of the King's Road), that has given multiple performances of the Passion in Southwest Finland, Central Finland and Ostrobothnia.

Hymn tunes

 ""
 "", text by Martin Luther
 ""
 ""
 ""
 "", text by Michael Weiße (tune name, GELOBT SEI GOTT)  
 ""
 ""
 "" (1609), Zahn No. 6288b
 ""
 ""

List of selected works
  (1602)
  (1603)
  (1604)
  (1612)
  (1613, new edition 1981)
  (1614)

Citations

External links

Melchior Vulpius (Bach-Cantatas.com)

Sheet music and MIDIs for some of Vulpius' motets

1570s births
1615 deaths
People from Schmalkalden-Meiningen
German classical composers
German Lutherans
Classical composers of church music
Renaissance composers
German male classical composers